Tragocephala variegata, the longhorn shoot borer,  is a species of flat-faced longhorn beetles belonging to the family Cerambycidae.

Varietas
 Tragocephala variegata var. albida Aurivillius, 1923
 Tragocephala variegata var. chevrolatii White, 1856
 Tragocephala variegata var. kaslica Thomson, 1878
 Tragocephala variegata var. nigropunctata Harold, 1878
 Tragocephala variegata var. sulphurea Breuning, 1934
 Tragocephala variegata var. vittata (Fåhraeus, 1872)

Description
These longhorn beetles have yellow elytra with irregular black markings. Pronotum is divided by a central longitudinal yellow stripe.

These beetles feed on Baobab  (Adansonia digitata), Spanish Cedar (Cedrela odorata), Mango (Mangifera indica), Blackeyed Pea (Vigna unguiculata), Senegal Mahogany (Khaya senegalensis).

Distribution
This species can be found in Angola, Democratic Republic of the Congo, Equatorial Guinea, Ethiopia, Kenya, Malawi, Mozambique, Namibia, Somalia, South Africa, Sudan, Tanzania, Zambia and Zimbabwe, but there have been minor sightings in other Central African countries.

References
 Biolib
  Worldwide Cerambycoidea Photo Gallery
 Lamiaires du Monde
 Hans G. Schabel  Forest Entomology in East Africa: Forest Insects of Tanzania

variegata
Beetles described in 1849